Ragay, officially the Municipality of Ragay, is a 1st class municipality in the province of Camarines Sur, Philippines. According to the 2020 census, it has a population of 59,770 people.

History
No date was known as to the establishment of the municipality of Ragay although it was recorded that the town was still a visita of Lupi on April 15, 1753.

Geography

Barangays
Ragay is politically subdivided into 38 barangay's.

Climate

Demographics

Economy

Transportation

The municipality is connected with Manila by the Andaya Highway and daily rail services to and from Naga & Legazpi are provided by the Philippine National Railways.

In order to spur development in the municipality, The Toll Regulatory Board declared Toll Road 5 the extension of South Luzon Expressway. A 420-kilometer, four lane expressway starting from the terminal point of the now under construction SLEX Toll Road 4 at Barangay Mayao, Lucena City in Quezon to Matnog, Sorsogon, near the Matnog Ferry Terminal. On August 25, 2020, San Miguel Corporation announced that they will invest the project which will reduce travel time from Lucena to Matnog from 9 hours to 5.5 hours.

Another expressway that will serve Ragay is the Quezon-Bicol Expressway (QuBEx), which will link between Lucena and San Fernando, Camarines Sur.

References

External links
 [ Philippine Standard Geographic Code]
Philippine Census Information
Official Site of the Province of Camarines Sur
 

Municipalities of Camarines Sur